Gimel DeShaun President (born June 24, 1993) is a former American football defensive end. He was signed by the Texans as an undrafted free agent in 2017. He played college football at Auburn and Illinois.

Early life and high school career
He was born in 1993 in Mount Pleasant, South Carolina to parents Zola and Delores Simmons. President played as a defensive end in football at Wando High in South Carolina under Coach Jim Noonan. In his senior year, President finished with 77 tackles, 5 sacks, 5 forced fumbles, 2 fumble recoveries and 11 pass breakups.

College career
President redshirted in 2012. He played for three seasons at Auburn (2013-15) before transferring to Illinois for his final collegiate campaign. He tallied 45 tackles, seven tackles for loss and three sacks during his three seasons at Auburn. He was granted immediate eligibility at Illinois in 2016 after graduating with a degree in fitness, conditioning, and performance from Auburn.

Professional career

Houston Texans
President signed with the Houston Texans as an undrafted free agent on May 12, 2017. He was waived by the Texans on September 2, 2017 and was signed to the practice squad the next day. He was promoted to the active roster on November 29, 2017.

On April 30, 2018, President was waived by the Texans.

Tennessee Titans
On May 1, 2018, President was claimed off waivers by the Tennessee Titans. He was waived/injured on August 10, 2018 and was placed on injured reserve. He was released on August 18, 2018. On December 18, 2018, President was signed to the Titans practice squad. He signed a reserve/future contract with the Titans on December 31, 2018. He was waived on August 1, 2019.

Houston Texans (second stint)
On August 4, 2019, President was signed by the Houston Texans. On August 30, 2019, President was released.

St. Louis BattleHawks
In October 2019, President was picked by the St. Louis BattleHawks in the 2020 XFL Draft. He had his contract terminated when the league suspended operations on April 10, 2020.

References

External links
Illinois Fighting Illini bio
Houston Texans bio 

1993 births
Living people
American football linebackers
Houston Texans players
Illinois Fighting Illini football players
People from Mount Pleasant, South Carolina
Players of American football from South Carolina
Tennessee Titans players
St. Louis BattleHawks players